Final Expenses is a remix EP by Alien Faktor, released in 1996 by Decibel.

Reception
A critic for Sonic Boom gave Abduction a positive review and said "each track is suitably distinct enough from the original to hardly be remained title the same" and "any previous AF fan or someone who is into bizarrely experimental electro with just a hint accessibility will enjoy this release without failure." Larry Miles of Black Monday and counted "Misanthrope" and "Dawn" as being highlights of the album.

Track listing

Personnel
Adapted from the Final Expenses liner notes.

Alien Faktor
 Tom Muschitz – vocals, programming, mastering, remixing (9)

Additional musicians
 Matt Green – remixing (8)
 Lars Hansen – remixing (6)
 Leif Hansen – remixing (6)
 Scott Morgan (as Sid) – remixing (2)
 Chris Peterson – remixing (1)
 Terry Reed (as Warlock) – remixing (5)
 Steven Seibold – remixing (3)
 Jason Simanek – remixing (4)
 Jeff Stoddard – remixing (1)
 David York (as D. York) – remixing (2)

Production and design
 Daniel Streng – design

Release history

References

External links 
 Final Expenses at Discogs (list of releases)

1996 EPs
Remix EPs
Alien Faktor albums
Decibel (record label) albums